The 2018–19 Scottish Challenge Cup, known as the IRN-BRU Cup due to sponsorship reasons, was the 28th season of the competition. The tournament took on a similar format from the previous season with the addition of two teams from England's National League entering the competition for the first time. This took the total number of participating clubs to 58.

Thirty teams from the Scottish Championship, Scottish League One and Scottish League Two competed, along with four teams from the Highland Football League (one eliminated in preliminary round) and four from the Lowland Football League (one eliminated in preliminary round). In addition to this, Under-21 teams of the clubs competing in the Scottish Premiership were represented. This was the third edition with two clubs from both Northern Ireland's NIFL Premiership and the Welsh Premier League and was the second time that two teams from the League of Ireland entered. A new change was the addition of two entrants from the English National League (fifth tier).

Inverness Caledonian Thistle were the defending champions after they beat Dumbarton 1–0 in the 2018 final, but they were eliminated in the first round by Dunfermline Athletic.

Ross County won the competition for the third time, defeating Connah's Quay Nomads 3–1 in the final.

Format

Preliminary round

Matches

First round
The draw for the first round was made on 26 June 2018 at 1pm live on the SPFL Facebook page.

North Section

Draw
Teams in Bold advanced to the second round.

Matches 

Notes

Replay

South Section

Draw
Teams in Bold advanced to the second round.

Matches

Second round

Teams from Wales (The New Saints and Connah's Quay Nomads), Northern Ireland (Crusaders and Coleraine), England (Sutton United and Boreham Wood) and the Republic of Ireland (Bohemians and Sligo Rovers) entered in the second round. Originally, Bray Wanderers were to be the second side to represent the League of Ireland however, they were subsequently thrown out by the FAI on 16 July 2018 for failing to pay their players and replaced by Limerick. A similar statement was released by the FAI hours later about Limerick who were also in financial difficulties. St Patrick's Athletic were then invited to compete as the next ranked team in line but declined. Sligo Rovers accepted the position in their place so they would represent the League of Ireland instead.

Draw

The draw for the second round was made on 16 August 2018 at 1pm live on the SPFL Facebook page.

Teams in Bold advanced to the third round.

Teams in Italics were not known at the time of the draw.

Matches

Third round

Draw
The draw for the third round was made on 11 September 2018 at 1pm live on the SPFL Facebook page.

Teams in Bold advanced to the quarter-finals.

Matches

Quarter-finals

Draw
The draw for the quarter-finals was made on 16 October 2018 at 1pm at The Hub in Edinburgh live on the SPFL Facebook page.

Teams in Bold advanced to the semi-finals.

Matches

Notes

Semi-finals

Draw
The draw for the semi-finals was made on 21 November 2018 at 1pm at Hampden Park live on the SPFL Facebook page.

Final

Player of the Round
The Golden Ball Award is a 'Player of the Round' award given to the player who is adjudged to have had the best performance of that round out of all the players in teams left competing in that round of the competition. The winner is voted for by supporters from a chosen short-list of players, which is posted on the Irn-Bru Football Twitter page.

Broadcasting rights
The domestic broadcasting rights for the competition are held jointly by BBC Alba, S4C (for matches involving Welsh teams) and subscription channel Premier Sports. Prior to the re-format in the 2016–17 season, BBC Alba had exclusive rights.

One of the semi-final matches was also confirmed as being broadcast live on BT Sport despite no apparent previous announcement of rights. 

The following matches were broadcast live on UK television:

References

External links
Scottish Challenge Cup at the Scottish Professional Football League

Scottish Challenge Cup seasons
Challenge Cup
3